Gianella Neyra Magagna (born 1977 in Arequipa, Peru), is a Peruvian actress and model.

Career
Neyra began acting at the age of seven and, as a child, attended the Actors Studio in New York City. In Peru, she pursued a modeling career.

In 2002, she was hired by Peru's Iguana Productions to star in the soap opera Bésame Tonto ("Kiss me, Fool") where she played the daughter of a mafia boss.

In 2004, Neyra went to Argentina to perform in Luna salvaje ("Savage Moon"), starring with Juan Darthés and Catalina Artusi. Neyra continued to star in other Argentinian productions including Culpable de Este Amor ("Guilty of This Love") and ¿Quién es el Jefe? (Who is the Boss?).

Personal life
In 2004, Neyra married her "Besame Tonto" co-star, Argentine actor Segundo Cernadas whom she separated from in 2011 and later divorced. The couple has a son, Salvador, born in 2008. Gianella Neyra later met Cristian Rivero, a Peruvian tv personality, with whom she's had a long relationship and now have a son, Gaetano, born in 2015.

Telenovelas

1995: Malicia
1996: Obsesión   .... Rita Reynoso/Rita Martin/Mariana
1997: Escándalo   .... Natalia
1997: Torbellino  .... Eliana
1998: Coraje  .... Reportera TV 1
1999: Girasoles para Lucía  .... Lucía Trevi
2000: María Rosa, búscame una esposa  .... María Rosa Garcia
2000: Imposible amor
2000: Ciudad de M   .... Sandra
2000: Amantes de Luna Llena   .... Isabel Rigores
2001: Yago, pasión morena  .... Morena Gallardo-Sirenio Chávez de Salaverri-Sirenio Rivas
2003: Bésame tonto   .... Julieta Rossini
2003: Polvo enamorado   .... Natalia
2004: Con Game    "Doble juego"  (Peru)
2004: Culpable de este amor   .... Laura Cazenave de Salazar
2005: ¿Quién es el jefe?   .... Soledad Carreras
2006: Dragones: destino de fuego   (voice)
2007: El capo
2007: Mi problema con las mujeres  .... Sol
2009: Los exitosos Gome$  .... Sol Gomes
2010: Pobre Millonaria  .... Isabella del Castillo
2011: LaLola  .... Dolores "Lola" Padilla Gassols

References

External links
 

1977 births
Living people
People from Lima
20th-century Peruvian actresses
Peruvian telenovela actresses
Lee Strasberg Theatre and Film Institute alumni
21st-century Peruvian actresses
Actresses from Lima
Peruvian child actresses